Brian Edward Sparrow (24 June 1962 – 6 December 2019) was an English professional footballer who played as a full back.

Career
Born in Bethnal Green, Sparrow began his career at Arsenal, from where he spent loan spells at Wimbledon, Millwall and Gillingham. After spending three seasons with Crystal Palace, Sparrow dropped down to non-league football with Enfield and then Crawley Town, where he was player-manager from 1991 to 1992,

After retiring as a player, Sparrow worked as reserve-team manager of Wimbledon, made a brief return to Crawley as caretaker manager, and coached at Brentford and Crystal Palace. On 26 February 2012, Sparrow was appointed as the manager of China League Two side Shenzhen Main Sports, the same day the club was founded. He left China after club boss Sammy Yu resigned in July 2012.

He died on 6 December 2019, at the age of 57.

References

1962 births
2019 deaths
Footballers from Bethnal Green
English footballers
Association football fullbacks
Arsenal F.C. players
Wimbledon F.C. players
Millwall F.C. players
Gillingham F.C. players
Crystal Palace F.C. players
Enfield F.C. players
English Football League players
English football managers
Crawley Town F.C. managers
Wimbledon F.C. non-playing staff
Brentford F.C. non-playing staff
Crystal Palace F.C. non-playing staff